"Shame" is the last single from the Drowning Pool album Full Circle. The single and the music video were released early 2009. It hit #26 on the US Mainstream Rock Tracks. Shame was released as a single when they were working on their self-titled album. The single is featured on the Saw IV soundtrack.

Music video
The music video was released at the same time as the single.

Track listing

Promo CD

Personnel
 Ryan McCombs - vocals
 C. J. Pierce - guitar
 Mike Luce - drums
 Stevie Benton - bass

Chart positions

Drowning Pool songs
2009 singles
Eleven Seven Label Group singles
2007 songs
Songs written by Stevie Benton
Songs written by Ryan McCombs